Ivano Maffei (born 24 September 1958) is an Italian former cyclist. He competed in the team time trial and the team pursuit events at the 1980 Summer Olympics.

References

External links
 

1958 births
Living people
Italian male cyclists
Olympic cyclists of Italy
Cyclists at the 1980 Summer Olympics
Sportspeople from Pisa
Cyclists from Tuscany